The Barauni–Gwalior Mail is a mail type of train of the Indian Railways connecting  in Madhya Pradesh and  of Bihar. It is currently being operated with 11123/11124 train numbers on a daily basis.

Arrival and departure
Train no.11124 departs from Gwalior daily at 11:45 hrs. from platform no.3 reaching Barauni the day following the next day at 13:05 hrs.
Train no.11123 departs from Barauni daily at 18:45 hrs., reaching Gwalior the day following next day at 21:00 hrs.

Route and halts

The train goes via Jhansi, ‌‌Kanpur, Lucknow, Gorakhpur, Babhnan railway station, Chhapra, Sonpur, Muzaffarpur. The important halts of the train are:

Coach composition

The train has standard LHB rakes with max speed of 110 kmph. The train consists of 23 coaches:

 3 AC First Tier
 5 AC Second Tier
 6 AC Third Tier
 8 Sleeper class
 Luggage / Parcel Van

Average speed and frequency

The train runs with an average speed of 80 km/h. The train runs daily.

Traction

This train is regularly hauled by WAP-4 and WAP-7 electric locos from Kanpur Loco Shed. In earlier days it is used to be hauled by diesel locomotive of WDM-3D class end to end traction.

Direction reversal 

The train reverses its direction once:

See also
 Ratlam–Gwalior Intercity Express
 Chambal Express
 Bhopal–Gwalior Intercity Express

Mail trains in India
Rail transport in Bihar
Rail transport in Madhya Pradesh
Rail transport in Uttar Pradesh
Transport in Gwalior